Solvang is a city in Santa Barbara County, California. It is located in the Santa Ynez Valley. The population was 6,126 at the 2020 census, up from 5,245 at the 2010 census. Solvang was founded in 1911 and incorporated as a city on May 1, 1985. Solvang is often dubbed "The Danish Capital of America".

Solvang's origins date back to 1804, when Mission Santa Inés was founded by the Spanish under Esteban Tápis. A small community grew up around the mission called Santa Inés during the Mexican period, but it was largely abandoned after the American Conquest of California. In 1911, a new settlement was founded around the mission by a group of Danish-Americans who purchased  of the surrounding Rancho San Carlos de Jonata, to establish a Danish community far from Midwestern winters. The community took on its distinctive Danish-themed architecture beginning in 1947 and has since become a prominent tourist destination. Though only about 10% of residents in the 21st century are Danish, the town attracts many tourists from the Nordic countries, and has been the subject of several Danish royal visits, most recently by Prince Henrik in 2011.

History

Beginnings

The Santa Ynez Valley, in which Solvang lies, was originally inhabited by the Chumash, identified by Father Pedro Font, chaplain of the 1776 Anza Expedition, as an ingenious and industrious people. They have an excellent astronomical system and are good fishermen and hunters.

As part of the expansion of the mission system established in California by Spanish missionaries, Father Estévan Tapís founded Mission Santa Inés, now located near the center of Solvang, in order to relieve overcrowding at Mission Santa Barbara and Mission La Purísima Concepción since it was located midway between the two. It also served as a gateway to the Chumash Indians living east of the Coast Range.

After the Mexican War of Independence, the Mexican Assembly passed the Secularization Laws which confiscated Mission lands, along with other property, and transferred them to the control of local ranchers, with Solvang being later founded on what became known as the Rancho San Carlos de Jonata. With secularization, Mission Santa Inés began to decline and the Chumash Indian population in the area along with it. For a time, the mission was a seminary but soon began to deteriorate. However, it was repaired by the Donahue family in 1884 and renovated by Fr. Alexander Buckler in 1904.

Danish immigrants

Between 1850 and 1930, a considerable number of Danes left Denmark, which was suffering from poor economic prospects. According to some estimates, as many as one in ten Danes emigrated during this period, mostly to the United States. The most popular destinations for Danish settlers were Utah, Wisconsin, Illinois, Minnesota, Iowa, Nebraska, and South Dakota. In many of the new communities, churches and schools were set up in accordance with the ideas of N. F. S. Grundtvig, an influential Danish philosopher, hymn-writer and Lutheran pastor. In particular, the so-called folk schools introduced a new approach to education based on a spirit of freedom, poetry and disciplined creativity. Folk schools were established in Elk Horn, Iowa (1878–1899); Grant, Michigan (1882–1888); Nysted, Nebraska (1887–1934); Tyler, Minnesota (1888–1935); and Kenmare, North Dakota (1902–1916); and finally in Solvang (1911–1931).

One of the most enthusiastic proponents of the Danish approach to religion and education was Benedict Nordentoft, who was born in Brabrand near Aarhus in 1873. After graduating in theology in 1898, he was soon tempted to travel to the United States, where he began coordinating relations between Danish Lutheran churches in Michigan, Ohio, New Jersey, New York, Connecticut, Massachusetts and Maine. In 1901, he returned to Denmark specifically to be ordained in Aarhus Cathedral. Back in America, he continued his work as a lecturer at Grand View College, a folk high school in Des Moines, Iowa, which was also set up by the Danish Lutheran Church. He was appointed president in 1903, a post which he held until 1910, when disagreements with his Grundtvigian colleagues forced him to resign.

From 1906, Nordentoft, together with Jens M. Gregersen, a pastor from Kimballton, Iowa, and Peder P. Hornsyld, a lecturer at Grand View, had discussed the possibility of creating a new Danish colony with a dedicated Lutheran church and school on the west coast. In 1910, together with other Danish-Americans, they created the Danish-American Colony Company in San Francisco. Later that year, suitable land was found in the Santa Ynez Valley northwest of Santa Barbara. On January 23, 1911, the contract was signed and Solvang was founded. The Danes had bought almost  of the Rancho San Carlos de Jonata land grant, paying an average of $40 per acre.

Among the other early arrivals with Mads Frese were Mr. and Mrs. Sophus Olsen, Hans Skytt, John Petersen and John Ahrenkild. Skytt was to play an important role as the carpenter, who constructed many of Solvang's early buildings. The first to be constructed was a hotel close to the Mission where new arrivals could be housed. Gregersen became president of the Danish-American Colony Company, and Nordentoft was named head and Hornsyld a teacher at the school, which opened on November 15, 1911, with 21 students.

Expansion

At the end of 1912, when it became almost impossible to sell any more plots of land, the company's income was vastly reduced. The shareholders persuaded Gregersen to give up his position as Solvang's pastor and travel to Iowa and Nebraska to convince Danish immigrants to buy land in the new colony. He enjoyed considerable success, relieving the colony of any further threats. After Gregersen's departure, Nordentoft became the pastor. Before long, Solvang also had a store, a bank, a lumber yard, a barbershop and a post office with Hornsyld as postmaster. Where there had just been fields, there was now a small town.

Folk high school
Nordentoft was not content with the little folk school in Solvang. When he was unable to convince Gregersen and Hornsyld that a larger educational institution was needed, he bought them out and started to raise funds for a bigger and better school. The following year, in August 1914, a rejsegilde or topping-out ceremony was held for the impressive new building, which Nordentoft called Atterdag College in memory of Valdemar Atterdag, who did much to consolidate the kingdom of Denmark in the 14th century. What surprised many of those who came to the celebration was the great similarity the building had with Grand View College. Standing on a hilltop above the village, the new college or folk high school was designed to teach Danish-speaking students in their late teens how to lead more meaningful lives with an emphasis on lectures, singing, gymnastics, folk dancing and fellowship. A difficult period followed, as World War I put a stop to Danish emigration to America, leading to a reduction in the number of young people requiring a school education. It also became difficult to maintain a Danish-speaking school at a time when American nationalism was steadily growing. Nordentoft, who felt he had achieved his ambitions in America, sold the college to the congregation of the Solvang Lutheran church in 1921 for $5,000 and returned to Denmark with his wife and family. Atterdag College continued to be used as a folk school, a community meeting hall, a performing arts venue, a gymnastics center, a summer school, and a boarding house until it was finally demolished in 1970, making way for the Solvang Lutheran Home.

Danish church

The Bethania Evangelical Lutheran Church was initiated by the Danish pioneers in 1912. For a number of years, church services were held in the school building until, in 1928, a new church was built by Hans Skytt and his colleagues. Solidly constructed in ferro-concrete with walls a foot thick, it was based on a photograph of a Gothic-styled Danish church and resembles one of the hundreds of rural churches in Denmark which were built or restyled in the 14th century. Its interior contains hand-carved woodwork on the altar, pulpit and altar rail. Services used to be mainly in Danish but apart from a Christmas service in Danish on lillejuleaften (December 23) each year, all the other services are in English.

Danish-styled architecture

Initially, most of Solvang's buildings were built in the same style as others in the area. The Lutheran church was the first to be based on Danish architecture and bears a close relationship to Danish equivalents. But after World War II, interest grew in the concept of a "Danish Village". The pioneer of the Danish Provincial style was  Ferdinand Sorensen, originally from Nebraska. In the mid-1940s, after returning to Solvang from a trip to Denmark, he first completed Møllebakken, his Danish-styled home, and then went on to build the first of the village's four windmills. A little later, Earl Petersen, a local architect, gave the older buildings a new look, adding façades in so-called "Danish Provincial" style. Buildings in the half-timbered style of Danish rural houses proliferated, creating a new tourist attraction. While much was done to create an "authentic" Danish atmosphere in the town center, it has been pointed out by Scandinavians that fake thatched roofs and artificial timbering are largely a result of local interests in general rather than those of the Danish immigrants themselves. The older buildings have simply been restyled to look Danish even if there was nothing Danish about them originally.

Subsequent development
During the 1920s, the proportion of non-Danish residents rose substantially and local businesses and churches began providing services in English, in addition to traditional Danish.  In the 1930s, Solvang became the largest town in the Santa Ynez Valley and a commercial hub for the local region.  By the late 1940s, Solvang's growth stagnated as the town's economic activity focused predominately on agriculture, prompting younger residents to leave in search of more diverse job opportunities.  In 1947, the town was featured in an article in The Saturday Evening Post entitled "Little Denmark", which praised Solvang's quaint rural charms and sparked a tourism boom prompting residents of Los Angeles and San Francisco to take weekend trips to Solvang. Solvang subsequently developed a tourism industry focused on emphasizing the town's Danish heritage. The 2004 film Sideways, brought attention to the vineyards in the surrounding Santa Ynez Valley and tasting rooms have opened. Restaurants are also part of the revitalization of Solvang as it becomes a destination for locally sourced fare.

Geography

Climate
Solvang enjoys sunshine throughout the year with clear, warm days and cool nights. Average temperatures vary between 52 and 72 °F (11 and 22 °C) with highs reaching the lower 90s °F (lower 30s °C) and winter lows in the upper 30s °F (below 5 °C). Furthermore, Solvang experiences large diurnal temperature variations, especially in the summer, when daily temperatures vary on average by almost 40 °F (20 °C). Average annual rainfall for Solvang (recorded between 1964 and 2010) is 19.31 inches (49 cm).

Demographics

2010
The 2010 United States Census reported that Solvang had a population of 5,245. The racial makeup of Solvang was 4,326 (82.5%) White, 38 (0.7%) African American, 59 (1.1%) Native American, 72 (1.4%) Asian, 1 (0.0%) Pacific Islander, 611 (11.6%) from other races, and 138 (2.6%) from two or more races. There were 1,530 Hispanic or Latino residents, of any race (29.2%).

The Census reported that 5,190 people (99.0% of the population) lived in households, 3 (0.1%) lived in non-institutionalized group quarters, and 52 (1.0%) were institutionalized.

There were 2,173 households, out of which 611 (28.1%) had children under the age of 18 living in them, 1,081 (49.7%) were opposite-sex married couples living together, 183 (8.4%) had a female householder with no husband present, 121 (5.6%) had a male householder with no wife present. There were 120 (5.5%) unmarried opposite-sex partnerships, and 18 (0.8%) same-sex married couples or partnerships. 636 households (29.3%) were made up of individuals, and 303 (13.9%) had someone living alone who was 65 years of age or older. The average household size was 2.39. There were 1,385 families (63.7% of all households); the average family size was 2.97.

The population was spread out, with 1,094 people (20.9%) under the age of 18, 384 people (7.3%) aged 18 to 24, 1,142 people (21.8%) aged 25 to 44, 1,530 people (29.2%) aged 45 to 64, and 1,095 people (20.9%) who were 65 years of age or older. The median age was 45.0 years. For every 100 females, there were 93.0 males. For every 100 females age 18 and over, there were 90.7 males.

The homeowner vacancy rate was 3.8%; the rental vacancy rate was 6.9%. 2,872 people (54.8% of the population) lived in owner-occupied housing units and 2,318 people (44.2%) lived in rental housing units.

2000
As of the census of 2000, there were 5,332 people, 2,185 households, and 1,415 families residing in the city. The racial makeup of the city was 88.24% White, 0.43% African American, 0.66% Native American, 1.05% Asian, 0.04% Pacific Islander, 5.51% from other races, and 4.07% from two or more races. Hispanic or Latino residents of any race were 19.86% of the population.

There were 2,185 households, out of which 26.8% had children under the age of 18 living with them, 53.2% were married couples living together, 8.1% had a female householder with no husband present, and 35.2% were non-families. 30.2% of all households were made up of individuals, and 14.1% had someone living alone who was 65 years of age or older. The average household size was 2.37 and the average family size was 2.96.

In the city, the population was spread out, with 21.9% under the age of 18, 5.5% from 18 to 24, 25.2% from 25 to 44, 24.4% from 45 to 64, and 22.9% who were 65 years of age or older. The median age was 43 years. For every 100 females, there were 89.8 males. For every 100 females age 18 and over, there were 86.2 males.

The median income for a household in the city was $45,799, and the median income for a family was $57,703. Males had a median income of $41,429 versus $30,175 for females. The per capita income for the city was $25,363. About 2.7% of families and 6.7% of the population were below the poverty line, including 4.5% of those under age 18 and 5.9% of those age 65 or over.

Economy

Top employers
According to Solvang's 2020 Comprehensive Annual Financial Report, the top employers in the city were:

Tourism

Solvang is a tourist attraction with over one million visitors per year. Tourists were initially attracted to Solvang by the visit of Denmark's Prince Frederik in 1939. But it was in 1947, following a feature article in The Saturday Evening Post, that they began to flock to the town. Sights include the Danish windmills, the statues of Hans Christian Andersen and The Little Mermaid replica, the half-timbered houses, the Danish rural church, the Round Tower as well as Danish music and folk dancing. Several restaurants and pastry shops serve Danish specialities. A replica of a 19th-century Danish streetcar, the horse-drawn Hønen ("the hen"), takes visitors on sightseeing tours around downtown Solvang. Partly as a result of the 2004 film Sideways, which was set in the surrounding Santa Ynez Valley, the number of wine-related businesses in Solvang has increased, attracting oenophiles to the downtown area.

Danish Days

Since 1936, Solvang has celebrated Danish folk traditions at its annual "Danish Days" event, usually held during the third weekend in September. Led by a "Danish Maid," the program consists of æbleskiver eating competitions, music, dancing, and processions through the downtown area with floats, marching groups, marching bands, folk dancers and singers. A Danish Days breakfast on Sunday morning features medisterpølser, a spiced pork sausage recipe of Danish origins, and æbleskiver.

Festival Theater

One of Solvang's attractions is the 700-seat open-air Festival Theater, which was built in 1974 following the success of a makeshift performance of Hamlet in 1971 in the town park. Strong support from the local business community, Donovan Marley (director of the Pacific Conservatory of the Performing Arts), and Earl Petersen (a local architect), allowed the structure to be completed in record time. Recent productions have included West Side Story and Les Misérables. The style of the exterior is reminiscent of both Danish and Elizabethan architecture.

Royal visits

On April 7, 1939, Danish Crown Prince Frederik and Princess Ingrid visited Solvang; at the time, a large number of the town's 400 residents were Danish immigrants. They drove through the grounds of Atterdag College and attended a Good Friday service at Bethania Church. The crown prince spoke of their reception favorably: "To find out traditions in our fatherland in new surroundings makes them only more beloved to us. We have been bathed in sunlight ever since we began this memorable day and now we have driven into a bit of Denmark tucked into this beautiful California."

On June 5, 1960, Princess Margrethe of Denmark paid a visit which included a reception at Palacio del Rio, lunch at Bethania Church and a tour of downtown Solvang. She returned on May 23, 1976, as Queen of Denmark together with her husband, Prince Henrik. After a formal luncheon in the Parish Hall, the couple visited Bethania Church and the Solvang Lutheran Home before greeting residents on Copenhagen Drive. Shortly after her visit, the queen awarded Solvang developer Ferdinand Sorensen the Order of the Dannebrog for strengthening ties between the United States and Denmark.

100th anniversary

Solvang celebrated its centennial in 2011. The first event in this connection was a visit by the Danish ambassador to the United States, Friis Arne Petersen, on July 11, 2010. Mr Petersen took a walking tour of downtown Solvang and visited the Mission. The mayor, Jim Richardson, greeted the ambassador with a private reception at the Elverhøj Museum. "I wanted him to see the people of our town, and the Danish community in particular," he explained.

The program for the centennial year started with the official launch on January 7, 2011. Centennial plans also included Christmas and New Year celebrations, including the proposed Julefest Parade on Saturday, December 3, 2011. Among the highlights were the Tour of California Time Trial on Friday, May 20 and the visit of the Aalborg Police Band for Danish Days during the weekend of September 16 to 18. Henrik, Prince Consort of Denmark, visited Solvang on June 11 which also happened to be his own 77th birthday. He was accompanied by the Danish ambassador, Peter Taksøe-Jensen, and Torsten Jansen, the cultural counselor at the Danish Embassy in Washington. The prince helped dedicate Solvang's Centennial Plaza, unveiling two bricks bearing the Danish royal monogram. He spoke of a relationship between the United States and Denmark "based on respect and common values and ideals" which was forged by individuals "who have made a new home without forgetting the old nation of their ancestors."

Nearby attractions
Opened in its present form in August 2003, the casino consists of a 94,000-square-feet (8,730 m2) gaming area with slot machines and table games. A 106-room hotel and spa opened in July 2004. In 2006, the Casino estimated that there were 2,894,561 visitors to the Casino and 34,049 guests in the hotel, nearly all of them from Southern California. The Santa Ynez Band of Chumash Indians have stated that the casino brings in some 6,000 patrons per day.

Bicycling

Solvang is a popular destination for bicyclists, and has been featured as a race location on the Tour of California. The surrounding countryside and variable terrain provide a variety of conditions useful for training. Two annual amateur bicycling events are held in Solvang: the Solvang Century (held in March) and the Solvang Prelude (held in November).

Museums

The Elverhøj Museum, housed in the former residence of artist Viggo Brandt-Erichsen, is devoted to preserving the Danish heritage of Solvang with its Danish-American pioneer spirit. The building which was completed in 1950 is inspired by the 18th-century farmhouses of northern Jutland. After extensive renovation, the museum opened to the public in May 1988. The cottage in the garden houses a diorama of scale models depicting Solvang in the 1920s. From January to April 2011, the museum was hosting an exhibition entitled "Spirit of Solvang" consisting of a series of old black-and-white photographs of the village enhanced by local resident Paul Roark.
The Hans Christian Andersen Museum, located above The Book Loft, is devoted to presenting the author's life and works. Displays include models of Andersen's childhood home and of "The Princess and the Pea". The museum also contains hundreds of volumes of Andersen's works, including many illustrated first editions.
The Vintage Motorcycle Museum displays machines from the private collection of Virgil Elings, a veteran motorcross and road racer. While there is an emphasis on vintage racing bikes, the collection is quite broad and ranges from 1910 to the present.

Transportation
State Route 246 runs through Solvang as Mission Drive, connecting Buellton and U.S. Route 101 to the west, and Santa Ynez and Highway 154 to the east.

Although most of Solvang's visitors arrive by car, there are three bus connections per day for those arriving at Santa Barbara by rail. The Santa Ynez Valley Transit bus service connects Buellton, Solvang, Santa Ynez, and Los Olivos. The Clean Air Express now connects Solvang and Buellton to Goleta and Santa Barbara.

The nearby Santa Ynez Airport caters to general aviation.

Public safety

The Santa Barbara County Sheriff's Office has a sub station in Solvang, while the Solvang Volunteer Fire Department was disbanded in April 2007 and replaced with a contract from the Santa Barbara County Fire Department.

In popular culture

Film
Solvang was one of the two locations featured in the William Castle film, Homicidal (1961). The location used for the drugstore and flowershop still stands today and remains relatively unchanged.
Parts of the horror film The Unseen (1980) were filmed in Solvang along or near Mission Drive, with particular use made of the Bit O' Denmark Restaurant and the Solvang Gardens Lodge, which was known as the Solvang Gaard Lodge at the time of filming.
Much of the Oscar-winning film Sideways (2004) was filmed in Solvang and in nearby Buellton.
Much of the Netflix film Paddleton (2019) takes place in Solvang.
The Lifetime film A Very Charming Christmas Town (2020) takes place almost entirely in Solvang.

Literature
In the Dean Koontz novel Watchers (1987), the main characters Travis and Nora go on a date in the town's Danish Village.
 In Faye Kellerman's detective mystery novel Street Dreams, the protagonists Peter Decker and Rina Lazarus travel to Solvang to meet an old woman living there, hear her reminiscences and try to solve a 75-year old unsolved murder.
 The narrator of Sluk, a novel by Danish-Norwegian writer Lars Saabye Christensen, spends time in Solvang.

Sports
The Tour of California cycle race has had time trial stages in Solvang on four occasions; 2007, 2008, 2009 and 2011.

Television

In "Rumspringa" season 6, ep 17 of New Girl, Jessica, Nick and Schmidt go to Solvang and experience the local delights.
 Full video: Solvang is the featured city in the hour-long 2002 Episode #113 of Road Trip With Huell Howser.In American Dad! Vol. 4 Ep. 2, Roger refers to buying chocolate in Solvang.
The town of Solvang was featured on Bravo's hit television show, Kathy Griffin: My Life on the D-List, on its third season.
Part of the plot of a season 1 episode of the Disney Channel original series A.N.T. Farm, "America Needs TalANT", features the main characters becoming stranded in Solvang; its original airdate was November 25, 2011.
In an episode of Pinky and the Brain, Brain forms a basketball team that has a practice session in Solvang.
In season 3 episode "Christmas Joy" of the TV show Psych Solvang's Danish Village is featured as the scene of the crime, portrayed as Solvang Santa's Village.
An episode of the Travel Channel show Stranded with Cash Peters featured Solvang.
 Solvang was mentioned in Season 2, Episode 4 of The Blacklist. When sarcastically asked by FBI agent Elizabeth Keen if he has spirited a witness away to "Saint Kitts or Solvang," James Spader's character Raymond Reddington responds, "Solvang? I never send anyone I care about to Solvang."
In season 5 episode "Happy Birthday, Anastasia", The Girls Next Door and their guests take a road trip which includes a visit to Solvang; its original airdate was January 4, 2009.
In The Simpsons episode "Little Orphan Millie", it was revealed that Milhouse has an uncle from Solvang named Norbert "Zack" Van Houten. Bart has a telephone conversation with a switchboard operator in Solvang, and a wooden "Solvang Air" airliner, whose fuselage resembles buildings in the town, is shown landing at Springfield Airport. Uncle Zack's overwhelming pride in his Danish heritage also reflects Solvang's history from its founding by Danish citizens.
In The Rockford Files episode "The Queen of Peru" (season 4, episode 12), Rockford pursues a family in an RV on their way to Solvang.
In Modern Family episode "Do it yourself" (season 8, episode 13), Jay tells Phil that he once took his dog Stella to a "farm-to-table" dog-bakery in Solvang.
In Star Trek: Lower Decks season 1 episode 10, a California-class ship named U.S.S. Solvang is present.
Solvang is the setting of the 2020 Lifetime movie A Very Charming Christmas Town, with the film shot entirely in the actual town.

Notable people
Kenny Baker, singer and actor, resided and died in Solvang.
Al Gionfriddo, outfielder and hero for the Brooklyn Dodgers in the 1947 World Series, resided and died in Solvang.
Patricia Hitchcock, actress and only child of film director Alfred Hitchcock, resided in Solvang.
Ska-punk band Mad Caddies calls Solvang its home.
Beach volleyball Olympic gold medalist Todd Rogers lives in Solvang with his family.
Professional cyclist Alison Tetrick was born in Solvang.
Stephanie Zimbalist lives part-time in the valley where she has a house inherited from her late father Efrem Zimbalist Jr.
Serial killer Thor Nis Christiansen lived in Solvang until his late teens.

Sister city

, Aalborg, since 1971.

Photo gallery

See also

Benedict Nordentoft, the co-founder of Solvang
Danish Americans
Kingsburg, a "Swedish village" in Fresno County, California
 Helen, Georgia
Leavenworth, Washington, a Bavarian theme town developed with assistance from Solvang.
 Frankenmuth, Michigan
 Little Portugal, San Jose

References

Further reading
 Bethania Evangelical Lutheran Church, Our First 75 Years 1912–1987, Solvang, 1987.
 William Etling, Sideways in Neverland: Life in the Santa Ynez Valley, California, iUniverse, Inc., 2005, 328 pages. 
 Joanne Rife, Solvang. Denmark in the USA'', The Book Loft, Solvang, 1975.

External links

Official website
Solvang Conference & Visitors Bureau
Solvang, CA
Activities to do in Solvang

 
1911 establishments in California
1985 establishments in California
Cities in Santa Barbara County, California
Danish-American culture in California
Danish emigrants to the United States
 Danish-American culture
 Danish-American history
History of Santa Barbara County, California
Incorporated cities and towns in California
Populated places established in 1911
Populated places established in 1985
Tourist attractions in Santa Barbara County, California